Tiff or TIFF may refer to:

Film festivals
 Tbilisi International Film Festival, held in Tbilisi, Georgia, since 2000
 Thessaloniki International Film Festival, held in Thessaloniki, Greece, since 1960
 Tigerland India Film Festival, held in India, since 2014
 Tokyo International Film Festival, held in Tokyo, Japan, since 1985
 Toronto International Film Festival, held in Toronto, Canada, since 1976
 Transilvania International Film Festival, held in Cluj-Napoca, Romania, since 2001
 Tromsø International Film Festival, held in Tromsø, Norway, since 1991

People
 Milan Tiff (born 1949), American track and field athlete
 Tiffany Tiff Lacey (born 1985), British singer
 Timothy Tiff Needell (born 1951), British racing driver and television presenter
 Richard Tiffany Tiff Macklem (born 1961), Canadian banker and Governor of the Bank of Canada
 Timothy Findley (1930–2002), Canadian novelist and playwright nicknamed "Tiff"
 Tiff Joy, stage name of American gospel singer Tiffany Joy McGhee (born 1986)

Places
 Tiff, Missouri, an unincorporated community in Washington County, Missouri, U.S.
 Tiff City, Missouri, an unincorporated community in McDonald County, Missouri, U.S.

Technology
 TIFF, Tagged Image File Format, a file format for storing images
 Tooth interior fatigue fracture (TIFF), a type of gear failure

Other uses
 Baryte, or tiff, a mineral consisting of barium sulfate
 "Tiff" (song), a 2013 song by Simi
 Tiff, a character in the Kirby franchise

See also
 Tiffs, a nickname for branch badges worn by the British Royal Navy
 TIF (disambiguation)
 TIFFE (disambiguation)
 Tifi (disambiguation)

Lists of people by nickname
Hypocorisms